Vadodara Innovation Council (VIC) is the first city-based Innovation Council in India, associated with the National Innovation Council. Vadodara Innovation Council started functioning in May-2011 under the leadership of technocrat Dr. Madhu Mehta. VIC, a non-profit company, has the stated goal  "To build Innovative, Curious and Questioning Society in Vadodara region".

Vadodara as an Innovative city
On 16 June 2013, Sam Pitroda has launched the vision and initiative to make 'Vadodara as an Innovative city', the first-of-its-kind in India.

Tod Fod Jod Centre

It has started 'Tod Fod Jod Centre' (TFJC) for school students, being the second such initiative in India after Delhi. IT is a unique initiative, where students open the device, understand the different parts, its working principles, scientific & engineering concepts behind it and then assemble it. In its first phase, the students experimented with a ceiling fan, computer, clock, bicycle and telephone.

Innovation partner to VCCI Expo 2014
Vadodara Chamber of Commerce Industry (VCCI) has partnered with VIC for VCCI Expo 2014 (27 November 2014 – 1 December 2014), where 56 participants showcased their innovation or prototypes.

InnoQuest - Digital
It has partnered with DDKF Mumbai to start sessions on digital learning.

Recognitions 
As a result of its hosting an innovation workshop for 10,000 school students in the short span of 8 months, it received commendable recognition at national level. The model is to be replicated in 1,000 cities of India. In its first phase 31 schools including 11 municipal (government) schools were covered.

See also
 National Innovation Foundation
 National Innovation Council

References

Government agencies established in 2011
2011 establishments in Gujarat
Think tanks based in India
Organisations based in Vadodara
Government agencies of India
Innovation organizations
Innovation in India